Chegini Kosh (also Romanized as Chegīnī Kosh, Chagīneh Kosh, Chagīnī Kosh, Chegenī Kosh, Chegnī Kosh, and Chigini Kush) is a village in Shirvan Rural District, in the Central District of Borujerd County, Lorestan Province, Iran. At the 2006 census, its population was 636, in 143 families.

References 

Towns and villages in Borujerd County